Alexander or Alex Rossi may refer to:

 Alexander Rossi (born 1991), American racing driver
 Alexander Rossi (artist) (1841–1916), British artist
 Alex Rossi (footballer), Brazilian footballer
 Alex Rossi (journalist), British television correspondent